The Alternative Music Foundation located at 924 Gilman Street, often referred to by its fans simply as "Gilman", is a non-profit, all-ages, collectively organized music club. It is located in the West Berkeley area of Berkeley, California, about a mile and a half west of the North Berkeley BART station and a quarter-mile west of San Pablo Avenue, at the corner of 8th and Gilman Streets.

Gilman is mostly associated with being the springboard for the '90s punk revival led by bands like Green Day, Operation Ivy, Rancid, AFI, and The Offspring.

Gilman showcases mostly punk rock, specifically pop punk and hardcore punk acts, as well as heavy metal, industrial metal, grindcore, ska punk and, most recently, hip hop.

History

Establishment

As early as 1984, punk rock fan and Maximumrocknroll founder Tim Yohannan began thinking about establishment of an all ages music space in the San Francisco bay area where bands could play and interact with audience members free of the structure of conventional music promotion. Actual organizational work began in 1985, with Yohannan joined in the effort by Victor Hayden, who had previously started a parallel project to start a punk club in Berkeley and who had already located a promising space in an industrial section of Berkeley. Although Yohannan initially had misgivings about the 924 Gilman Street location spotted by Hayden, he was ultimately persuaded that the building was a suitable space for the project which was envisioned. Negotiations began with the landlord and in April 1986 a lease was signed.

The organizing circle was expanded with a view to raising the $40,000 needed for rent and remodeling and for generating the volunteers necessary to make the construction project happen. Yohannan made use of his political connections and experience gained as a campaign volunteer for Berkeley Citizen's Action Group, an organization which had won majority control of the Berkeley City Council, and was able to call upon friends sitting on various city boards, urging their cooperation with the new venture. Berkeley mayor Gus Newport was supportive and project organizers crossed their t's and dotted their i's in winning the tacit approval for the project from businesses and residents of the area. The landlord also proved himself reliable and supportive of the goals of his new tenants.

Tim Yohannan later recalled:

"We didn't know shit about construction, and people were coming out of the woodwork, just showing up and helping—people who had the skills we needed, carpenters, plumbers, electricians. We had to build new bathrooms, etc., and pass the inspections. We got our final approval from the city the afternoon of our first show, which was New Year's Eve, December 1986."

Rent on the 2,000 square foot building was $2,000 per month at the time of the club's launch—regarded as a reasonable and manageable rate.

On December 31, 1986, the first musical performance was held at 924 Gilman. Since then, it has been one of the longest-running independent music venues in the United States. The club slowly progressed as a mecca for punk youth to get away from everyday issues at home, work, government, etc.

In its initial phase hardcore punk shows were held three days a week—on Friday and Saturday nights as well as Sunday matinees. This quickly proved to be overwhelming for club volunteers, however, and as an alternative non-hardcore shows began to be run on Fridays by a separate crew of organizers. These Friday shows were more poorly attended than the Saturday night and Sunday afternoon hardcore extravaganzas but nevertheless served their purpose of providing an alternative venue to bands seeking to escape the grim reality of 21-and-over bar shows while allowing core volunteers to avoid the burnout associated with excessive event scheduling. This necessary scheduling adjustment had the serendipitous effect of diversifying and broadening the base of support for the 924 Gilman space.

Founding principles
As one early participant recalled, "in order to not be closed down by local police we had to have rules, such as no drinking in or around the club, no fighting, things like that." This necessitated a regularized approach to security and resulted in events that were less violent than the 1980s hardcore norm, providing a more or less "safe environment" and sense of collective responsibility.

Josh Levine, a long time punk rock fan, band member, and 1986 Gilman volunteer later recalled:

"There was something in the air, you could say, back then. A good feeling, or a sense of pulling together, and unity among people who just wanted to see bands that was free of sexism, homophobia, racism, and especially violence. Shows were not as safe then—there were shows I went to before Gilman where I got beat up... Shows where I went to jail, just for being a punk rock kid out after curfew. And worse, shows where I saw people getting beat up by skinheads, or jocks, and there was not a damn thing I could do about it if I wanted to stay healthy. Those were the kind of things that motivated us to get involved."

Despite a few early incidents of vandalism, a fertile creative environment rapidly developed. The venue saw the first public appearance of Operation Ivy, a thrashing ska-punk outfit that gained nearly instantaneous local popularity, and was a proving grounds for the young Green Day—the albums of whom helped to launch the Lookout Records empire of Larry Livermore and David Hayes. The eclectic sounds of this and other pioneer "Gilman bands" stood in contrast to the speed metal and ultra-aggressive hardcore which dominated the punk world during the middle 1980s.

Staying true to the "independent spirit" was also a major component of the venue's philosophy, and many of the bands that started out at Gilman found themselves on the outs with the club after achieving mainstream success. Green Day's song "86" from their album Insomniac is about being banned from the club after their major label debut Dookie was released.

September 1988 closure

Although the Gilman "warehouse" provided a vital all-ages venue and spawned a vibrant local musical scene, its success was neither inevitable nor linear. On September 11, 1988, citing the "physical and emotional exhaustion" of volunteers, ongoing problems with vandalism, and financial difficulties resulting from a $16,000 legal award to a slam dancer who had fallen and broken his arm in the pit, and expiration of the building lease, Gilman shut its doors. In a published eulogy by Tim Yohannan, Gilman was remembered as a fun place where "the old macho bullshit got attacked" and a stand had been made against "creeping racist and fascist crap." The club's core volunteers were not despondent, Yohannan noted, and hoped to "arrange special shows at other existing venues" in the future.

A note was scrawled on a scrap of paper and taped to the window by Yohannan, noting that the Gilman Street Project was "now closed permanently due to lack of the creative juices necessary to make it worthwhile." Yohannan added that "apathy and taking Gilman for granted" had "led to a consumerist attitude" and that the decision had been made by core volunteers to "work together in other ways."

Although the September closure spelled an end to Tim Yohannan's personal connection with the club, core volunteers almost immediately reorganized to launch a "new club" at the 924 Gilman location, based upon the core principles established by the previous venture. A new Gilman Street Project Newsletter was launched, in which it was announced that the number of shows would be cut from 8 to 5 a month to reduce volunteer workload and fan apathy. In addition, door prices were to be raised from $5 to $6 and a professional security guard was to be hired to help police troublemakers outside the venue. Booking, previously done by Tim Yo, would subsequently be done by new volunteers.

2016 boycott
In May 2016, members of the club's community anonymously called for a boycott of 924 Gilman in online posts over Facebook and Tumblr citing several failures of the club in upholding its stated rules and ethics, notably a show featuring controversial hardcore punk bands Fang and Slapshot only narrowly being moved to an alternative venue, as well as allegations of sexism, transphobia and ableism made against some core volunteers at the time. Maximumrocknroll expressed support for the boycott, with then-editor Grace Ambrose stating that "Gilman's actions run counter to the spirit that propels MRR."

In 2018, the collective made an official response in the form of a Facebook post that acknowledged the frustrations brought to light by the boycott, as well as re-iterating the club's commitment to its values. The response was made following the exit of many volunteers named in the boycott, and highlighted the diversity of its staff relative to earlier iterations of the club as well as stating a goal of "amplifying marginalized voices through the shows we book and the events we host"
While the boycott has not officially concluded, several bands previously in support of the boycott have since returned to play at the venue.

Music 
Gilman showcases mostly punk rock, running the gamut from hardcore punk and grindcore to pop punk and ska punk, including as well industrial metal and, most recently, hip hop.

Bands with major label contracts, including AFI, The Offspring, and Green Day, are only allowed to play the club when membership approves that individual show, a policy that enabled Green Day to play at Gilman again at least twice since they signed with a major label. Many of the other bands which have played the club in the past are now defunct. The venue still serves the East Bay and Northern California hardcore scene by bringing local, national, and international acts to the East Bay.

A 2004 history of the club, 924 Gilman: The Story So Far, was written and edited by Brian Edge, who collected memories and anecdotes from many of the seminal contributors to the club's day-to-day operations from 1986 through publication in 2004. The book is available through AK Press and also contains a full list of Gilman's shows from 1986 through early 2004.

Jello Biafra incident

On May 7, 1994, an incident occurred in which former Dead Kennedys singer Jello Biafra was assaulted and injured. A group of rough slam dancers in the pit had been crashing into audience members. In the process one of these individuals, said to be a man using the punk rock name "Cretin," knocked Biafra into a chair, with another rolling over his legs, causing serious damage to one knee and leg. Biafra is said to have yelled an epithet at the individual who crashed into him and demanded that he produce identification so that he could be billed for whatever hospital costs would ensue. A fight ensued, during which Biafra is said to have been knocked to the floor and held down, where he was kicked in the head by "Cretin." During the incident others are said to have taunted Biafra, yelling "rich rock star" and "sellout."

Police were called but "Cretin" and his friends escaped the premises in a van bearing Arizona plates. Biafra was hospitalized, where it was determined that he suffered detached ligaments and a broken leg. Biafra was also forced to cancel a scheduled spoken word tour as a result of the injuries he suffered. Biafra held Maximumrocknroll indirectly responsible for the incident, claiming that his assailants were repeating allegations that he was a "rich rock star" made in a column which had recently appeared in the magazine.

Appearance in music videos

924 Gilman has been used as a filming location for several music videos.

The Mr. T Experience - "Gilman Street" was filmed in Gilman and posted on the Lookout Records YouTube channel.
 Green Day - Revolution Radio, entirely shot at 924 Gilman Street
 Link 80 - Verbal Kint, directed by Scott Pourroy, the video was shot on January 17, 1997 at 924 Gilman Street Link 80 was banned from Gilman for a few weeks after filming there but were allowed to return after a vote at the following membership meeting.
 Like Roses - Basket Case, cover, shot in collaboration with several bands, performing at 924 Gilman on February, 2nd 2019
 Grumpster - Bad Seed, entirely, Roots, filmed at 924 Gilman from 3:20 onwards, and Vicious
 Sarchasm - Cover Up Your Ears partially shot inside 924 Gilman and in its vicinity.

Footnotes

External links

Buildings and structures in Berkeley, California
Social centres in the United States
Hardcore punk
Music of the San Francisco Bay Area
Music venues in the San Francisco Bay Area
Nightclubs in the San Francisco Bay Area
Punk rock venues
Music venues completed in 1986
1986 establishments in California
All-ages DIY venues in the United States